Loreta Rogačiova (born 19 March 2001) is a Lithuanian footballer who plays as a midfielder for Lithuanian Women's A League club FK Vilnius and the Lithuania women's national team.

Club career
Rogačiova has played for FC Gintra in Lithuania.

International career
Rogačiova capped for Lithuania at senior debut during the UEFA Women's Euro 2022 qualifying.

References

2001 births
Living people
Lithuanian women's footballers
Women's association football midfielders
Gintra Universitetas players
Lithuania women's youth international footballers
Lithuania women's international footballers